Ramzan may refer to:

 Ramadan, also written as "Ramzan" because of the Persian transliteration "Ramzān".

Given name
 Ramzan Asayev (born 1993), Russian footballer
 Ramzan Kadyrov (born 1976), President of Chechnya and a former Chechen rebel
 Ramzan Khadzhiev (1955–1996), Kazakh-born Chechen journalist
 Ramzan Mezhidov (1967–1999), freelance Chechen cameraman
 Ramzan Paskayev (born 1947), Chechen accordionist and folk musician
 Ramzan Rizwan, Pakistani tissue seller and murderer
 Ramzan Tsutsulayev (born 1972), Russian footballer and coach

Surname

 Mohammad Ramzan (born 1970), Pakistani cricketer
 Muhammad Ramzan (preacher) (1769–1825), Haryana-born preacher
 Tarak Ramzan, British businessman

Arabic masculine given names
Arabic-language surnames